Theodor Holm Nelson (born June 17, 1937) is an American pioneer of information technology, philosopher, and sociologist. He coined the terms hypertext and hypermedia in 1963 and published them in 1965. According to a 1997 Forbes profile, Nelson "sees himself as a literary romantic, like a Cyrano de Bergerac, or 'the Orson Welles of software'."

Early life and education
Nelson is the son of Emmy Award-winning director Ralph Nelson and Academy Award-winning actress Celeste Holm. His parents' marriage was brief and he was mostly raised by his grandparents, first in Chicago and later in Greenwich Village.

Nelson earned a B.A. in philosophy from Swarthmore College in 1959. While there, he made an experimental humorous student film, The Epiphany of Slocum Furlow, in which the titular hero discovers the meaning of life. His contemporary at the college, musician and composer Peter Schickele, scored the film. Following a year of graduate study in sociology at the University of Chicago, Nelson began graduate work in "Social Relations", then a department at Harvard University specializing in sociology, ultimately earning an A.M. in sociology from the Department of Social Relations in 1962. After Harvard, Nelson was a photographer and filmmaker for a year at John C. Lilly's Communication Research Institute in Miami, Florida, where he briefly shared an office with Gregory Bateson. From 1964 to 1966, he was an instructor in sociology at Vassar College.

During college and graduate school, he began to envision a computer-based writing system that would provide a lasting repository for the world's knowledge, and also permit greater flexibility of drawing connections between ideas. This came to be known as Project Xanadu.

Much later in life, in 2002, he obtained his PhD in media and governance from Keio University.

Project Xanadu

Nelson founded Project Xanadu in 1960, with the goal of creating a computer network with a simple user interface. The effort is documented in the books Computer Lib / Dream Machines (1974), The Home Computer Revolution (1977) and Literary Machines (1981). Much of his adult life has been devoted to working on Xanadu and advocating for it.

Throughout his career, Nelson supported his work on the project through a variety of administrative, academic and research positions and consultancies, including stints at Harcourt Brace and Company (a technology consultancy and assistantship where he met Douglas Engelbart, who later became a close friend; 1966-1967), Brown University (a tumultuous consultancy on the Nelson-inspired Hypertext Editing System and File Retrieval and Editing System with Swarthmore friend Andries van Dam's group; c. 1967-1969), Bell Labs (hypertext-related defense research; 1968-1969), CBS Laboratories ("writing and photographing interactive slide shows for their AVS-10 instructional device"; 1968-1969), the University of Illinois at Chicago (an interdisciplinary staff position; 1973-1976) and Swarthmore College (visiting lecturer in computing; 1977).

Nelson also conducted research and development under the auspices of the Nelson Organization (founder and president; 1968-1972) and the Computopia Corporation (co-founder; 1977-1978). Clients of the former firm included IBM, Brown University, Western Electric, the University of California, the Jewish Museum, the Fretheim Chartering Corporation and the Deering-Milliken Research Corporation. He has alleged that the Nelson Organization was envisaged as a clandestine funding conduit for the Central Intelligence Agency, which expressed interest in Project Xanadu at an early juncture; however, the promised funds failed to materialize after several benchmarks were met.

From 1980 to 1981, he was the editor of Creative Computing. At the behest of Xanadu developers Mark S. Miller and Stuart Greene, Nelson joined San Antonio, Texas-based Datapoint as chief software designer (1981–1982), remaining with the company as a media specialist and technical writer until its Asher Edelman-driven restructuring in 1984. Following several San Antonio-based consultancies and the acquisition of Xanadu technology by Autodesk in 1988, he continued working on the project as a non-managerial Distinguished Fellow in the San Francisco Bay Area until the divestiture of the Xanadu Operating Group in 1992–1993.

After holding visiting professorships in media and information science at Hokkaido University (1995-1996), Keio University (1996-2002), the University of Southampton and the University of Nottingham, he was a fellow (2004–2006) and visiting fellow (2006–2008) of the Oxford Internet Institute in conjunction with Wadham College, Oxford. More recently, he has taught classes at Chapman University and the University of California, Santa Cruz.

 
The Xanadu project itself failed to flourish, for a variety of reasons which are disputed. Journalist Gary Wolf published an unflattering history of Nelson and his project in the June 1995 issue of Wired, calling it "the longest-running vaporware project in the history of computing". On his own website, Nelson expressed his disgust with the criticisms, referring to Wolf as "Gory Jackal", and threatened to sue him. He also outlined his objections in a letter to Wired, and released a detailed rebuttal of the article.

As early as 1972, a demonstration iteration developed by Cal Daniels failed to reach fruition when Nelson was forced to return the project's rented Data General Nova minicomputer due to financial exigencies. Nelson has stated that some aspects of his vision are being fulfilled by Tim Berners-Lee's invention of the World Wide Web, but he dislikes the World Wide Web, XML and all embedded markup – regarding Berners-Lee's work as a gross over-simplification of his original vision: HTML is precisely what we were trying to PREVENT— ever-breaking links, links going outward only, quotes you can't follow to their origins, no version management, no rights management.

Jaron Lanier explains the difference between the World Wide Web and Nelson's vision, and the implications: 
A core technical difference between a Nelsonian network and what we have become familiar with online is that [Nelson's] network links were two-way instead of one-way. In a network with two-way links, each node knows what other nodes are linked to it. ... Two-way linking would preserve context. It's a small simple change in how online information should be stored that couldn't have vaster implications for culture and the economy.

Other projects
In 1957, while a student, Nelson co-wrote and co-produced what he describes as a pioneering Rock Musical. Entitled "Anything and Everything", it was produced and performed at Swarthmore College.

In 1965, he presented the paper "Complex Information Processing: A File Structure for the Complex, the Changing, and the Indeterminate" at the ACM National Conference, in which he coined the term "hypertext".

In 1976, Nelson co-founded and briefly served as the advertising director of the "itty bitty machine company", or "ibm", a small computer retail store that operated from 1977 to 1980 in Evanston, Illinois. The itty bitty machine company was one of the few retail stores to sell the Apple I computer. In 1978, he had a significant impact upon IBM's thinking when he outlined his vision of the potential of personal computing to the team that three years later launched the IBM PC.

From the 1960s to the mid-2000s, Nelson built an extensive collection of direct advertising mail he received in his mailbox, mainly from companies selling products in IT, print/publishing, aerospace, and engineering. In 2017, the Internet Archive began to publish it online in scanned form, in a collection titled "Ted Nelson's Junk Mail Cartons".

ZigZag

As of 2011, Nelson was working on a new information structure, ZigZag, which is described on the Xanadu project website, which also hosts two versions of the Xanadu code. He also developed XanaduSpace, a system for the exploration of connected parallel documents (an early version of this software may be freely downloaded).

Influence and recognition
In January 1988 Byte magazine published an article about Nelson's ideas, titled "Managing Immense Storage". This stimulated discussions within the computer industry, and encouraged people to experiment with Hypertext features.

In 1998, at the Seventh WWW Conference in Brisbane, Australia, Nelson was awarded the Yuri Rubinsky Memorial Award.

In 2001, he was knighted by France as Officier des Arts et Lettres. In 2007, he celebrated his 70th birthday by giving an invited lecture at the University of Southampton. In 2014, ACM SIGCHI honored him with a Special Recognition Award.

Neologisms
Nelson is credited with coining several new words that have come into common usage especially in the world of computing. Among them are:
 "hypertext" and "hypermedia", both coined by Nelson in 1963 and first published in 1965
 transclusion
 virtuality
 intertwingularity

Publications
Many of his books are published through his own company, Mindful Press.
 Life, Love, College, etc. (1959)
 Computer Lib: You can and must understand computers now / Dream Machines: New freedoms through computer screens—a minority report (1974), Microsoft Press, revised edition 1987: 
 The Home Computer Revolution (1977)
 Literary Machines: The report on, and of, Project Xanadu concerning word processing, electronic publishing, hypertext, thinkertoys, tomorrow's intellectual revolution, and certain other topics including knowledge, education and freedom (1981), Mindful Press, Sausalito, California; publication dates as listed in the 93.1 (1993) edition: 1980–84, 1987, 1990–93
 The Future of Information (1997)
 A Cosmology for a Different Computer Universe: Data Model, Mechanisms, Virtual Machine and Visualization Infrastructure. Journal of Digital Information, Volume 5 Issue 1. Article No. 298, July 16, 2004
 Geeks Bearing Gifts: How The Computer World Got This Way (2008; Chapter summaries)
 POSSIPLEX: Movies, Intellect, Creative Control, My Computer Life and the Fight for Civilization (2010), autobiography,  published by Mindful Press via Lulu

References

External links

 Ted Nelson's homepage
 Ted Nelson's homepage at xanadu.com.au
 Ted Nelson on YouTube
 Ted Nelson on Patreon
 
 Transliterature – A Humanist Design
 : An Interview with Ted Nelson, 1999.
 Software and Media for a New Democracy a talk given by Ted Nelson at the File festival Symposium/November/2005.
 "We Are the Web". Wired article, recalling interview with Nelson, August 2005.
 , a talk given by Ted at Google, January 29, 2007.
 Ted Nelson Possiplex Internet Archive book reading video, October 8, 2010.
 Ted Nelson original interview footage from PBS's Machine That Changed the World, 1990.
 Video excerpts of a dinner at Howard Rheingold's home with Doug Englebart and Ted Nelson, August 18, 2010.
 , August 18, 2014.

 
1937 births
American educators
American expatriates in the United Kingdom
American philosophers
American sociologists
Fellows of Wadham College, Oxford
Harvard University alumni
Internet pioneers
Living people
American people of Swedish descent
American people of Norwegian descent
Swarthmore College alumni
Keio University alumni
Officiers of the Ordre des Arts et des Lettres